The Irish Rovers in Australia is a 1976 album by the Irish-Canadian music group The Irish Rovers.

Track listing 
Side 1
"South Australia"
"Orange and Green"
"Waltzing Matilda"
"The Unicorn"
"Come By The Hills"
"10,000 Miles Away"
"Click Go the Shears"
"Queensland Drovers"
"Whiskey on a Sunday"
"The Overlanders"
Side 2
"A Pub with No Beer"
"Black Velvet Band"
"Sunny Sydney Lady"
"Wild Colonial Boy"
"Drovers Dream"
"Wild Rover No More"
"Sydney Harbour Ferry Boat"
"Lazy Harry"
"Botany Bay"
"Biplane Evermore"

External links 
 In Australia: the Irish Rovers at the Balladeers

The Irish Rovers albums
1976 albums